HMS Caicos was a  of the United Kingdom that served during World War II. She was originally ordered by the United States Navy as the  patrol frigate USS Hannam and was transferred to the Royal Navy prior to completion. It was named after the Caicos Islands.
 
After her return to U.S. Navy custody, she was sold to Argentina and served in the Argentine Navy (Armada de la Republica Argentina) as a frigate under the names ARA Trinidad (P-34) and ARA Santísima Trinidad (P-34) from 1948 to 1962. After a refit she then served as a survey ship as ARA Augusto Lasserre (Q-9) from 1963 to 1969.

Construction and acquisition
Originally designated a "patrol gunboat", she was ordered by the United States Maritime Commission under a U.S. Navy contract as Type S2-S2-AQ1 hull number 1659 and named USS Hannam. She was reclassified as a "patrol frigate", PF-77, on 15 April 1943 and laid down by the Walsh-Kaiser Company at Providence, Rhode Island, on 23 April 1943. Intended for transfer to the Royal Navy, the ship was renamed Caicos by the British before being launched on 6 September 1943.

Service history

Royal Navy, World War II, 1943–1945
Transferred to the United Kingdom under Lend-Lease on 31 December 1943, the ship was commissioned in the Royal Navy as HMS Caicos (K505) – sources claim that she was partially funded by the Turks and Caicos Islands colony, after part of which she was named – on either 31 December 1943 or 2 January 1944.

Uniquely among all World War II frigates, Caicos was fitted to perform aircraft direction duties. The Royal Navy originally intended to send her to the Indian Ocean, but instead assigned her to duty in the North Sea, where she attempted to detect German V-1 flying bombs during their flights toward targets in Great Britain. Two members of her crew died during her war service.

Disposal and transfer to Argentina

The United Kingdom returned Caicos to the U.S. Navy on 12 December 1945. The U.S. Navy then transferred her for disposal to the U.S. Maritime Commission, which sold her in June 1946 to the N. B. Wolcott firm of New York City for scrapping. However the plans to scrap her were cancelled and she was resold to Argentina on 6 July 1947. Thus, although many Tacoma-class patrol frigates served in foreign navies after completing their U.S. Navy service, Caicos became the only Colony-class frigate to serve in another navy after completing her British service.

Argentine Navy, 1947–1970

Frigate, 1948–1960
The ship was incorporated into the Argentine Navy on 4 August 1947, and assigned the name ARA Trinidad (P-34) in memory of ARA Santísima Trinidad, an Argentine Navy brigantine of 1815–1816 that saw action in the Argentine War of Independence. Commander (S) D. Rodolfo A. Muzzio initiated a campaign to assign the full name Santísima Trinidad to her, and she became ARA Santísima Trinidad (P-34) on 3 October 1950.

Santísima Trinidad served as part of the Frigate Force of the Sea Fleet from 1948 until 1960. During this time she operated in the South Atlantic Ocean, participating in annual fleet exercises, especially the antisubmarine warfare exercises she was designed for. In 1948–1949 she participated in the 11th Antarctic Campaign. In 1959, she participated in Operation Neptune II, and received a battle honour from Vicario General Castrense and Cardenal D. Antonio Caggiano on 8 December 1960. She then went into reserve from 1961 to 1962.

According to Janes Fighting Ships, her armament in Argentine service as Santísima Trinidad consisted of two 105 mm (4.1 in) guns, eight 40 mm antiaircraft guns, 1 Hedgehog antisubmarine mortar, and six depth charge throwers.  Conways states that she had four 47 mm antiaircraft guns instead of eight 40 mm antiaircraft guns.

Survey ship, 1963–1969
Starting in 1962, Río Santiago Shipyard (AFNE) converted Santísima Trinidad into a survey ship. The conversion included disarming her, installing eight specialised cabinets, nine probe basins, and a helicopter landing platform, as well as a general refit. She was reclassified as a survey vessel (in Spanish Buque de Investigacion) and renamed ARA Comodoro Augusto Lasserre (Q-9), There was a spelling error in the original decree, which called her "Laserre" instead of "Lasserre"; this was corrected in 1964.

She was recommissioned as a survey ship on 27 January 1964. She undertook hydrographic surveys each year from 1964 to 1968.  In 1968 she ran aground near Lion Island (Isla Leones) in the Palmer Archipelago during a storm.  After she was refloated, she was inspected at Puerto Belgrano, and it was recommended that she be taken out of service.  She was struck from the navy list on 20 February 1969. Her decommissioning ceremony was in March 1969, and she was sold for scrapping in 1971.

References

External links

 A photo of Comodoro Augusto Lasserre (Q-9) taken in 1965; it shows that she had been disarmed.  Photographer: Robert Hirst.
  NavSource Online: Frigate Photo Archive – HMS Caicos (K 505), ex-Hannam (PF 77), ex-PG-185 Has photos of her as Caicos, as Santísima Trinidad and disarmed as Comodoro Augusto Lasserre.
 
 

1943 ships
Ships built in Providence, Rhode Island
Tacoma-class frigates
Colony-class frigates
World War II frigates and destroyer escorts of the United States
World War II frigates of the United Kingdom
Ships transferred from the United States Navy to the Argentine Navy
Tacoma-class frigates of the Argentine Navy
Research vessels of Argentina
Survey ships
Maritime incidents in 1968
Shipwrecks in the Southern Ocean